Pulguero is one of the forty subbarrios of Santurce, San Juan, Puerto Rico.

Demographics
In 2000, Pulguero had a population of 1,196.

In 2010, Pulguero had a population of 1,035 persons and a population density of 20,700 persons per square mile.

See also
 
 List of communities in Puerto Rico

References

Santurce, San Juan, Puerto Rico
Municipality of San Juan